Arrissalah ( Ar-Risala: the message, or  Ar-Risala Magazine) was an Arabic weekly cultural magazine for literature, science, and art published in Cairo from 1933 to 1953. It has been described as "the most important intellectual weekly in the 1930s Egypt and the Arab world."

History and profile
The first issue of Arrissalah appeared in January 1933. It was published by Dar Arrissalah and owned and edited by Ahmad Hasan al-Zayyat. Muhammad Farid Abu Hadid was instrumental in the establishment of the magazine. It was consisted of 86 pages which were printed on the A4-sized paper. Arrissalah was started as a biweekly publication, but its frequency was switched to weekly later.

The magazine featured the work of prominent writers such as Sayyid Qutb, Ahmad Amin, Muhammad Farid Abu Hadid, Ahmad Zaki Pasha, Mustafa 'Abd al-Raziq, Mostafa Saadeq Al-Rafe'ie, Taha Hussein, Mahmoud Mohamed Shaker, and Aboul-Qacem Echebbi.

References

External links

1933 establishments in Egypt
1953 disestablishments in Egypt
Arabic-language magazines
Biweekly magazines published in Egypt
Defunct literary magazines published in Egypt
Magazines established in 1933
Magazines disestablished in 1953
Magazines published in Cairo
Weekly magazines published in Egypt